The Chewa (or AChewa)  is an ethnic group found in Malawi, Zambia and few in Mozambique. The Chewa are closely related to people in surrounding regions such as the Tumbuka and Nsenga. They are historically also related to the Bemba, with whom they share a similar origin in the Democratic Republic of the Congo. As with the Nsenga and Tumbuka, a small part of Chewa territory came under the influence of the Ngoni, who were of Zulu or Natal/Transvaal origin. An alternative name, often used interchangeably with Chewa, is Nyanja. Their language is called Chichewa. Internationally, the Chewa are mainly known for their masks and their secret societies, called Nyau, as well as their agricultural techniques.

The Chewa (like the Nyanja, Tumbuka, Senga, Nsenga, Mang'anja) are a remnant of the Maravi (Malawi) people or empire.

There are two large Chewa clans, the Phiri and Banda, with a population of 1.5 million people. The Phiri are associated with the kings and aristocracy, the Banda with healers and mystics.

History 
Oral records of the Chewa may be interpreted to refer to origins in Malambo, a region in the Luba area of the Democratic Republic of the Congo, from where they emigrated into northern Zambia, and then south and east into the highlands of Malawi. This settlement occurred sometime before the end of the first millennium. After conquering land from other Bantu peoples, they regrouped at Choma, a place associated with a mountain in northern Malawi, and the plateau of northeastern Zambia.

This is one of a number of different interpretations of the early oral records of the Chewa. The first Chewa kingdom was established some time before or after 1480, and by the 16th century there were two systems of government, one maintained by the Banda clan at Mankhamba (near Nthakataka), and the other by the Phiri clan at Manthimba. The Phiri are associated with the Malawian mountain Kaphirintiwa.

By the 17th century, when the 'Malawi' state had been unified, the Portuguese had made some contact with the Chewa.  Although the Portuguese did not reach the heartland of the chiefdom, there are well-documented records of contacts between 1608 and 1667. By 1750, several 'Malawi' dynasties had consolidated their positions in different parts of central Malawi; however the Chewa, had managed to distinguish themselves from their neighbours through language, by having special tattoo marks (mphini), and by the possession of a religious system based on the nyau secret societies.

Culture 

Women have a special place in Chewa society and belief. They are recognized as reproducers of the lineage (Bele), which is an extended family of people related to the same ancestor. As a matrilineal society, property and land rights are inherited through the mother. Bele means "descended from the same breast". Children of the same mother or female (Lubele la achite) make up a family of dependents or Mbumba. Elder brothers of the mothers are called Nkhoswe, are the guardians of the lineage, and are mentors to their sisters' sons.

When crops are sold, income from the sale belongs to the woman of the house.

The village was led by a headman (Mfumu), a position to which every villager of good character could aspire. Village headmen and headwomen were subordinate to regional chiefs (Mwini Dziko), who were themselves subordinate to Paramount Chiefs. Subordination meant the regular payment of tribute, as well as readiness to supply men in time of war.

Notable individuals 

 Justin Malewezi
 John Tembo
 Lazarus Chakwera
 Jessie Kabwila-Kapasula
 Hastings Kamuzu Banda
 Aaron Gadama
 Isabel Apawo Phiri

References

External links
Tola Akindipe, George Kondowe, Learn Chichewa on Mofeko
Chichewa Discover Bible Guides
Pre-colonial migrations and agricultural change on the western side of lake Malawi, professor Kings Phiri
Chewa Religion
Court Layouts, including Chewa Paramount Chief Undi's court